The Polyball is the most prestigious public event of the ETH Zurich. It has a long tradition since the 1880s and takes place annually at the end of November. The Polyball is the biggest decorated ball in Europe with approximately 9’000 visitors and is a classic dance event.

History 
The exact year and the location of the first Polyball - then known as Akademie - is unknown. A general assumption is that the first ball took place in 1880. In 1929 the name changed from Akademie to Polyball. Since the 1940s each Polyball has its one theme with respective decorations of the ballrooms.
Since its beginning in the Stadttheater Zürich (municipal theatre, now Zürich Opera House) the location has changed several times, such as Tonhalle Zürich, Grand Hotel Dolder, Zürcher Messegelände (Zürich fair areal) as well as the ETH main building where it takes place today.

The ball 
The Polyball takes place within the main building of the ETH including the multifunctional hall. It starts at 19:00 on the last Saturday in November and ends at 05:00 on Sunday morning. The ball comprises 16 to 20 ballrooms decorated according to the ball theme. A variety of bands, from street performer to ballroom orchestra, entertain the dancers.

Organisation 
The Polyball is organized by the KOSTA foundation. It is an officially approved organisation of the VSETH and the University of Zurich (UZH) student societies. Students and former students of ETH, UZH and other colleges form the functional body of KOSTA. The planning and preparation of the ball takes place throughout the year. The decorations are created within 4 weeks in November by numerous students who in return earn their tickets for the Polyball. The decoration includes the interior as well as the exterior of the ETH main building.

List of themes 
2022 - Tanz im Tal der Könige
2019 - Chasing Northern Lights
2018 – Eine Nacht wie im Märchen
2017 – A Rather British Night
2016 – PolybAll – A Light Year in a Night
2015 – Weltenbummler
2014 – Tanz der Elemente
2013 – New York Nights
2012 – Scheherazade – 1000 Geschichten und eine Nacht
2011 – Auf der Suche nach Eldorado
2010 – Night out in the *20’s
2009 – Une Merveille
2008 – Winterwelt
2007 – Mit Säbel und Sextant
2006 – Die Stadt
2005 – Sternenwerfer
2004 – Ball-alaika
2003 – Kitsch as Kitsch can
2002 – Roma – Baci Antichi
2001 – Feuerball
2000 – Tanz der Sinne
1999 – Latente Talente
1998 – Versunkene Welten
1997 – Le palais dance
1996 – Das Experiment
1995 – Bal des Arts
1994 – Ballo Magico
1993 – Bal des Jeux
1992 – Metropolys
1991 – Time Machine
1990 – CH 90
1989 – Spaceball
1988 – Shakesbier
1987 – Vulcano Forte
1986 – Globetrotter
1985 – Polywood
1984 – Märliball
1983 – Polympia
1982 – Polyairball
1981 – Aquarius
1980 – Traumhochzeit hoch drei
1979 – Hannibal
1978 – Ali Baba
1977 – Goldrausch
1976 – Polyklinisches (cancelled)
1975 – Odyssee
1974 – Münchhausen
1973 – Walpurgisnacht
1972 – Gulliver
1971 – Contrast
1970 – Land in Sicht
1969 – Heureka
1968 – Time Out
1967 – Vivat Vamp
1966 – Arche Noah
1965 – Grieche sucht Griechin
1964 – Hans im Glück
1963 – Perpetuum mobile
1962 – Mit Lackschuh und Zylinder
1961 – Fata Morgana
1960 – Farbe!
1959 – Unterm Dach juhee
1958 – Latente magica
1957 – *1953 unknown
1952 – Spinnen am Abend
1951 – Polyball – Zauberball
1950 – *1949 unknown
1948 – Katzenjammer
1947 – Waldburgisnacht
1946 – Seid fröhlich, denn die Fröhlicheit schmückt Feste
1945 – Dämonenspuck
1944 – Aquarium
1943 – Fröhliche Wissenschaft
1942 - Skorpion

Further reading

References

External links
Main page of the polyball
KOSTA foundation
VSETH student organisation
VSUZH student organisation

Balls (dance party)
ETH Zurich